Phacelia bipinnatifida, or Purple Phacelia, is a species of phacelia native to the southeastern United States. Its common names include fernleaf phacelia and spotted phacelia.

It is a biennial plant growing 25–50 cm tall. The flowers bloom in spring and are round and lavender-blue in color and up to two centimeters diameter.

References

University of Texas at Austin

External links

bipinnatifida
Flora of the Northeastern United States
Flora of the Southeastern United States
Flora of the North-Central United States